Carlos Manuel Maza (born April 9, 1988) is an American journalist and video producer who started the Vox series Strikethrough. The Columbia Journalism Review described him as "Brian Stelter meets NowThis".

Early and personal life
Maza was born on April 9, 1988. His parents were immigrants from Cuba, and he has three younger siblings, a sister and two half-brothers. Maza frequently played video games as a child, and his mother described him as smart but introverted.

Maza attended Christopher Columbus High School in Westchester, Florida, where he joined the debate club. According to Maza, the debate club gave him the confidence to speak out and be himself, and he later described it as "the most meaningful thing that's ever happened to me". Maza graduated from Wake Forest University in 2010 with a BA in political science. He is a socialist and a member of the Democratic Socialists of America.

Career 
Maza worked at Media Matters for America from 2011 to 2016, where he was a research fellow and created a video series on media criticism. At Media Matters, he was also the LGBT Program Director, focusing on combating what he described as LGBT misinformation and working for LGBT equality. During this time, he created his Twitter handle, "@gaywonk". He then began working at Vox Media, where he successfully proposed Strikethrough and began producing and hosting the series.

In June 2019, YouTube investigated conservative commentator Steven Crowder for repeatedly using racist and homophobic slurs against Maza over the course of multiple years in videos reacting to Strikethrough. Maza said that Crowder's fans have doxxed and harassed him as a result of Crowder's videos. Crowder responded that his videos are meant as comedy and that he is opposed to doxxing and harassment. Four days later, YouTube stated that Crowder's language was "hurtful" but did not violate its policies and would not be removed from the site. The decision drew considerable criticism and, on the next day, shortly after revising its policy on hate speech, YouTube decided to suspend Crowder's ability to run ads or monetize his videos until Crowder addressed "all of the issues" with his channel.

Strikethrough was canceled in July 2019, and Maza moved from Vox Media's video team to a new creative role directly under Vox publisher Melissa Bell. In late January 2020, Maza announced that he would leave Vox Media. In February 2020, after leaving Vox, Maza started a media-critique channel on YouTube. In an interview with Business Insider, Maza voiced his dissatisfaction with YouTube while also stating that he "might as well flood its airwaves with leftist propaganda" by returning to the platform as an independent creator.

References

External links 
 
 Vox profile
 

Place of birth missing (living people)
1988 births
Living people
Activists from Florida
American activist journalists
American left-wing activists
American people of Cuban descent
American web producers
American YouTubers
Florida socialists
Gay journalists
Journalists from Florida
American LGBT journalists
LGBT people from Florida
LGBT producers
American LGBT rights activists
Media Matters for America people
Members of the Democratic Socialists of America
People from Miami-Dade County, Florida
Victims of cyberbullying
Videographers
Vox (website) people
Wake Forest University alumni
Washington, D.C., socialists
21st-century LGBT people
Competitive debaters